Whiskey Run is a  long 1st order tributary to Chartiers Creek in Allegheny County, Pennsylvania.

Course
Whiskey Run rises in Green Tree, Pennsylvania, and then flows west to join Chartiers Creek at Carnegie.

Watershed
Whiskey Run drains  of area, receives about 38.1 in/year of precipitation, has a wetness index of 329.30, and is about 19% forested.

See also
 List of rivers of Pennsylvania

References

Rivers of Pennsylvania
Rivers of Allegheny County, Pennsylvania